The 80-string , known as the  in Japanese, was an invention of Japanese composer Michio Miyagi created in 1923. Miyagi added 67 strings to the traditional 13-string  design, creating an instrument much like a western harp. Together, the 80 strings provide a far larger pitch range than the standard . It is widely seen as a short-lived experimental instrument.

Construction

The 80-string  was largely hand-constructed, as only limited machinery existed to manufacture it. It was built along similar lines to the common , but with reinforced design elements; for instance, the platform where strings are tied runs the entire length and breadth of the instrument to accommodate the increased strain.

These bridges are rearranged as needed during playing, and are arranged according to the particular tuning used. Strings are traditionally made from silk threads, although plastic nylon strings are often used as a cheaper alternative.

Usage
The 80-string  is not widely used. There are few extant examples of the instrument today, as it never achieved the popularity of the 17-string koto, Miyagi's more widely accepted invention.

References

Zithers
Japanese musical instruments
Koto players